Pearls Kabaddi World Cup 2010 was the first international circle style kabaddi world cup and was held in Punjab, India.

Teams
With the last-minute withdrawal of Norway, nine teams competed for the Prize Money Pearls World Cup Kabaddi Punjab-2010 hosted by the Punjab Government at different venues of the state from 3 to 12 April.

Pools
Announcing the draw, Organising Secretary Pargat Singh said that the teams would be divided into two pools. Hosts India were placed in Pool A while their traditional rivals Pakistan were in Pool B.

Competition format
Nine teams competed in the tournament consisting of two rounds. In the first round, teams were divided into two pools of five and four teams, and followed round-robin format with each of the teams playing all other teams in the pool once.

Following the completion of the pool games, teams placed first and second in each pool advanced to a single elimination round consisting of two semifinal games, a third place play-off and a final.

Venues
World Cup Kabaddi Punjab-2010 was held at various districts of Punjab from 3–12 April 2010. The venues were as follows:
Yadvindra Public School Stadium, Patiala
War Heroes Stadium, Sangrur
Guru Gobind Singh Stadium, Jalandhar
Lajwanti Stadium, Hoshiarpur
Government College Stadium, Gurdaspur
Guru Nanak Stadium, Amritsar
Sports Stadium, Bathinda
Guru Nanak Stadium, Ludhiana

Prize money
The winning team received a cash award of 1 crore besides a glittering rolling trophy. Runners-up took 51 lakh and third-place winners 21 lakh.

The fourth position were worth 10 lakh. Besides, individual awards (tractors) and other prizes were also given among the winners. Each team also got a sum of Rs 5 lakh as appearance money.

Schedule
All matches' timings are according to Indian Standard Time (UTC +5:30).

Group stage

Pool A

 Qualified for semifinals

Pool B

 Qualified for semifinals

Knockout stage

Semi-finals

Third-place playoff

Final

Broadcasting rights
: Punjab Television Channel (PTC) had the broadcasting rights in India and Asia.

Winners
India won the Kabaddi World Cup by defeating Pakistan in an interesting match on 12 April 2010 at Guru Nanak Stadium, Ludhiana and won 1 Crore as a Prize money and a glittering Golden World Cup Trophy. Pakistani team was paid 51 lakh as prize money and a Silver Cup Trophy. The best stopper award was won by Indian Captain Mangat Singh Manga and Best Raider award won by Kulwinder Singh Kinda of Canada. Both players were given tractors as an award. Mr. Parkash Singh Badal was heard to pay 5,000 to each player for every point but in the end this amount was reduced to 2,000. A government job was also announced for each Indian player.

References

Kabaddi World Cup
Kabaddi World Cup
Kabaddi competitions in India
Sport in Punjab, India